Tamarillo was a part-Arabian gelding that excelled in the sport of eventing under rider William Fox-Pitt.

Foaled in 1992 at Biddesden Stud Tamarillo was shown successfully as a young horse becoming Part Bred Champion at the annual National Arabian Horse Show in Malvern in 1995.  He was first ridden by Diana Burgess through novice and intermediate levels. In 1999 the ride was taken over by William Fox-Pitt. Together they represented Britain in international competitions from 2002.  Tamarillo was withdrawn after the cross country phase of the Athens Olympics after chipping his stifle.

In September 2013 it was announced that a clone of Tamarillo, named Tomatillo, had been born.

Achievements 

2000

Blarney CCI** - 1st
Gatcombe Park BCI - 1st
Blenheim Horse Trials CCI*** - 2nd
2002

Badminton Horse Trials CCI**** - 2nd
Jerez De La Fronter (World Equestrian Games) CH**** - 14th and Team Bronze medal
2004

Badminton Horse Trials CCI**** - 1st
Athens Olympics CH**** - Team Silver
2005
Badminton Horse Trials CCI**** - 2nd
FEI Blenheim Petplan European Eventing Championships CH*** - Individual Silver and Team Gold Medals
2006
Aachen (World Equestrian Games) CH**** - 15th and Team Silver medal
2008
 Burghley Horse Trials CCI**** - 1st

References

Pedigree
Biddesden Stud Website 
William Fox-Pitt Official Website 
Dunlewey Stud 

Eventing horses
Individual Arabian and part-Arabian horses
Horses in the Olympics
1992 animal births
2015 animal deaths